Robert Rutherford (October 20, 1728October 10, 1803) was an American pioneer, soldier and statesman from western Virginia. He represented Virginia in the United States House of Representatives from 1793 until 1797.

Robert was born in Scotland but emigrated to America as an infant with his parents, Thomas and Sarah. They originally immigrated to Pennsylvania, but soon settled in Virginia. He was the first U.S. Congressman from west of the Blue Ridge mountains in Virginia.

Captain Robert Rutherford commanded a company of rangers (Rutherfords Rangers) during the French and Indian War from 1758-1759.

Electoral history
1793; Rutherford was elected to the U.S. House of Representatives with 56.61% of the vote, defeating nonpartisans Alexander White and John Smith.
1795; Rutherford was re-elected, defeating nonpartisan Daniel Morgan.

References

External links
Congressional biography

1728 births
1803 deaths
People from Charles Town, West Virginia
Scottish emigrants to the United States
Democratic-Republican Party members of the United States House of Representatives from Virginia
People of pre-statehood West Virginia
People of Virginia in the French and Indian War